Joe Axel Abrigo Navarro (born 22 March 1995) is a Chilean professional footballer who plays as a midfielder for Coquimbo Unido.

Personal life
He is the cousin of Jason Flores, another professional football player.

Honours
Individual
 Copa Sudamericana Ideal Team (1): 2020

References

External links

1995 births
Living people
People from Santiago
Footballers from Santiago
Association football midfielders
Chilean footballers
Chilean expatriate footballers
Deportes Magallanes footballers
Magallanes footballers
Coquimbo Unido footballers
Audax Italiano footballers
C.D. Veracruz footballers
Unión Española footballers
Ñublense footballers
Primera B de Chile players
Chilean Primera División players
Liga MX players
Chilean expatriate sportspeople in Mexico
Expatriate footballers in Mexico